Paul Staub was a Swiss coxswain who competed in the 1920 Summer Olympics and was the part of the Swiss Team which won a gold medal in 1920 Antwerp in coxed four.

References

Year of birth missing
Year of death missing
Swiss male rowers
Olympic rowers of Switzerland
Rowers at the 1920 Summer Olympics
Olympic gold medalists for Switzerland
Olympic medalists in rowing
Coxswains (rowing)
Medalists at the 1920 Summer Olympics
European Rowing Championships medalists
20th-century Swiss people